Colonel David Synnot, also spelt Sinnot, was an Anglo-Irish soldier from County Wexford, who was Governor of Wexford for Confederate Ireland when it was captured by Oliver Cromwell in 1649.

As commander of the town, Synnot was negotiating with Cromwell, when his subordinate surrendered the castle without his knowledge, allowing Parliamentarian troops to break in. In the sack that followed, an estimated 2,000 members of the garrison and townspeople died; over 300 were drowned trying to escape over the River Slaney, including Synnot.

His family's estates were confiscated; his surviving son became a Protestant, and settled in Ballymoyer, Armagh. His descendants included Sir Walter Synnot (1742-1821), a linen merchant who became a substantial landowner; Ballymoyer House was demolished in 1919, but the estate is owned by the National Trust.

References

Sources
 
 

1649 deaths
People of the Irish Confederate Wars
17th-century Irish people
Politicians from County Wexford
Year of birth unknown
1593 births